Sir Desmond Angus Swayne  (born 20 August 1956) is a British Conservative politician serving as the Member of Parliament for the constituency of New Forest West since 1997.

Before going into politics, Swayne was a teacher, and then a manager at the Royal Bank of Scotland. He was Parliamentary Private Secretary to David Cameron, both during his time as Leader of the Opposition, 2005–10, and then for two years while Cameron was Prime Minister. In September 2012 he was appointed as Lord Commissioner of HM Treasury and in July 2014 as Minister for International Development. Swayne was knighted in the 2016 Birthday Honours for political and parliamentary services.

He was a supporter of the Eurosceptic pressure group Leave Means Leave. He is also a prominent critic of the British government response to the COVID-19 pandemic.

Early life and career
Desmond Angus Swayne was born on 20 August 1956 to George Joseph and Elizabeth McAlister Swayne (née Gibson). He was privately educated at Drumley House Preparatory School at Mossblown in South Ayrshire and Bedford School. He studied Theology at St Mary's College at the University of St Andrews.

He taught economics at Charterhouse School for one year followed by seven years at Wrekin College (both independent boarding schools). On 22 November 1986, as a prospective parliamentary candidate for a South Wales constituency, he was quoted in the Western Mail saying that "the surest way to protect the public from AIDS is to outlaw homosexuality and lock up offenders".  From 1987 to 1997, he was a computer systems manager at Royal Bank of Scotland.

Military career

On 2 August 1987, he was commissioned into the Royal Armoured Corps, Territorial Army in the rank of second lieutenant (on probation). He served with the Queen's Own Mercian Yeomanry. He was promoted to lieutenant on 2 August 1989, and to captain on 1 August 1992. On 1 November 1992, he transferred to the newly formed Royal Mercian and Lancastrian Yeomanry. He was promoted to major on 14 December 1996 with seniority from 1 January 1996.

In 2003, he was called up and posted to Iraq as part of the Iraq War. He served for six months before returning to the House of Commons.

Parliamentary career

Swayne unsuccessfully contested  the constituency of Pontypridd for the Conservative Party in the 1987 general election, before seeking office in the constituency of West Bromwich West in the 1992 general election, where he was defeated by the Labour incumbent Betty Boothroyd, who became Speaker of the House of Commons shortly afterwards. However, he was elected to the seat of New Forest West at the 1997 general election. In the 1997 Conservative Party leadership election, Swayne supported Michael Howard, and later John Redwood. He held the seat to serve his seventh consecutive term in the 2019 general election.

From 1997 to 2001, he held shadow ministerial portfolios for Northern Ireland, health and defence and as a senior opposition whip. From 2001 to 2005, Swayne was Parliamentary Private Secretary to both Iain Duncan Smith and Michael Howard in their role as Leader of the Opposition.

Following the election of David Cameron as leader of the Conservative Party in December 2005, he was appointed as his PPS. This position involved being the eyes and ears of Cameron in the House of Commons and reporting back on observations and requests from colleagues. In 2006, a series of Swayne's e-mails to Cameron with unflattering descriptions of fellow Conservatives was leaked to the media.

He maintained his role as a PPS in government. On 11 June 2011, it was announced Swayne would be appointed a Privy Counsellor in the Queen's 2011 Birthday Honours List. On 13 July 2011, Swayne was duly sworn in as member of Council. In 2014, he was appointed as a minister for international development.

In addition to his salary as an MP, in 2009 Swayne reportedly earned £12,000 a year as a director of property development firm Lewis Charles Sofia Property Fund, which predominantly specialises in holiday developments in Bulgaria; and around £5,000 in his role as a major in the Army Reserve.

In the Commons he sits on the Ecclesiastical Committee (Joint Committee). He has previously sat on the International Trade Committee, the Administration Committee, the Defence Committee, the Procedure Committee, the Social Security Committee and Scottish Affairs Committee.

As a result of the expenses scandal, Swayne repaid the £6,131 that he claimed for a new kitchen at his second-home flat in North Kensington in 2006, and £60.66 over claimed for a water bill. Swayne employs his wife Moira as part-time Executive Secretary/Office Manager. Swayne provided a full breakdown of his expenses on his website, and was found by local media in New Forest/South Dorset to be the lowest claiming of the local MP expenses' league table, after claiming £94,754 expenses in 2007/08, compared with £91,737 in 2006/07.

On 28 September 2019, Swayne remarked that "blackface" was an "entirely acceptable bit of fun". On 30 September, it was reported that he wore blackface while attending a Blues Brothers themed party, where he was pictured posing as James Brown. Swayne said he "went to some trouble to be as authentic as possible" in creating the costume. After initially declining to apologise, Swayne later said he was sorry for any offence that he gave. In June 2020, responding to a question about the policing of protests following the police murder of George Floyd in the US, Swayne said "looters, arsonists and rioters have it coming".

On 18 August 2021, Swayne suggested in Parliament that Afghan refugees should have been joining "the resistance" against a brutal regime rather than "queuing at the airport" after the fall of Kabul.

COVID-19 pandemic 
Swayne has been critical of the UK government's response to the COVID-19 pandemic, especially the lockdown response after 24 March 2020. Swayne believes that the government should have taken a softer approach, including keeping shops and public spaces open as had the Swedish government, and that the government's lockdown measures and policies were disproportionate to the threat posed by the virus.

Speaking to parliament in July 2020, Swayne described the Coronavirus law requiring the public to wear face masks in indoor public places as "a monstrous imposition", and said that it would make him less likely to go shopping. In a television interview in December 2020 he called for the health and scientific lobby to be "put in its place" and said: "they cannot go on telling us how we must live our lives forever."

In a speech in parliament on 28 September 2020, Swayne stated that "the policy of the government has been disproportionate in response to this threat. There may be a virus one day that threatens our very way of life, but this is not it, even if we are behaving as if it were." Furthermore, he argued that the government had been following the advice of small group of scientists without doing their job as politicians and imposing "a sense of proportion" and "not be in thrall" of science.

Swayne believes that there has been "censorship" of opposing arguments or criticisms of the lockdown policies. On 15 October 2020 Swayne asked the Leader of the House of Commons if a debate could be held on censorship due to "the sinister disappearance of the link from Google to the Great Barrington declaration". He has donated money to anti-lockdown demonstration organiser Piers Corbyn who had been fined for his breaching lockdown regulations.

It was reported in January 2021 that Swayne had said that some COVID-19 figures were being "manipulated", and that it was "difficult to reconcile" occupation levels of intensive care units with being "told there is a deathly, deadly pandemic proceeding". Swayne said that the NHS was "bouncing round at the typical level of deaths for the time of year", although at the time he spoke the Office for National Statistics was reporting deaths as 14% above the five-year average. The comments were made in a November 2020 interview with Save Our Rights, an anti-mask and anti-lockdown movement that had made false claims about COVID vaccines, during which Swayne urged the group to "persist" in its work. When questioned on the matter in January 2021, Swayne stated that "anyone who wants to talk to me about vaccines can consult my website or indeed my question I put to the Prime Minister yesterday [...] and you will see that you will see that I am the most enthusiastic vaxxer" and said that he "spoke to [Save Our Rights] exclusively about their campaign about lockdown because I share their objective. I'm against lockdown." Swayne's comments were criticised by the Center for Countering Digital Hate (CCDH), arguing such comments would "cost lives", and Deputy leader of the Labour Party Angela Rayner.

On 28 January 2021 the Minister for the Cabinet Office, Michael Gove, said that Swayne was "completely out of order" and should apologise. On the same day, Swayne responded to these comments on talkRADIO and Sky News. Angela Rayner urged action be taken against Swayne for endorsing conspiracy theories about COVID-19 and suggesting that the official figures had been manipulated, "a deeply dangerous claim for which there is absolutely no evidence". Swayne said that "we are getting very close to thought crime [...] that the deputy leader of the Labour Party is complaining about what another member of Parliament says and things as if this was some sort of criminal activity."

Swayne said that "What really worries me is the grip the scientists still have on driving policy. The government needs to recognise that this is coming at a devastating cost. At some stage someone has to have a more realistic point of view."

In a 2021 interview with anti-vaccination filmmaker Del Bigtree, Swayne said that Britain had become "a police state" and accused the government of attempting to enact "social control". When questioned about this by Sky News, Swayne stated that he had never heard of Bigtree. In January 2021, Swayne was criticised by the Board of Deputies of British Jews for his 2020 appearance on The Richie Allen Show, which has been accused of anti-Semitism.

In December 2021, Swayne was criticised for his arguments against compulsory vaccine passports, which included factually inaccurate comparisons between COVID deaths and those from flu and traffic accidents. Swayne questioned whether the health measures were proportionate, characterising the Health Protection Agency as a "Ministry of Fear" and saying that he felt his government had "abandoned any principle of social democracy or liberal democracy".

Personal life
Swayne married Moira Cecily Teek in 1987. They have one son and two daughters. He is a Christian and a member of Christians in Parliament.

Honours and decorations
Swayne is a recipient of the Queen's Golden Jubilee Medal, the Iraq Medal, and the Queen's Diamond Jubilee Medal. He has also received the Territorial Decoration for 12 years' service in the Territorial Army. In June 2009, he was awarded the Volunteer Reserves Service Medal.

Swayne was knighted in the 2016 Birthday Honours for political and parliamentary service.

References

Further reading

External links

 Desmond Swayne MP Official site
 
 Desmond Swayne MP Biography Conservative Party

1956 births
Members of the Privy Council of the United Kingdom
Conservative Party (UK) MPs for English constituencies
Alumni of the University of St Andrews
UK MPs 1997–2001
UK MPs 2001–2005
UK MPs 2005–2010
UK MPs 2010–2015
UK MPs 2015–2017
UK MPs 2017–2019
UK MPs 2019–present
British Army personnel of the Iraq War
Royal Mercian and Lancastrian Yeomanry officers
Living people
People educated at Bedford School
Parliamentary Private Secretaries to the Prime Minister
Knights Bachelor
Politicians awarded knighthoods
Royal Armoured Corps officers